Rafael Andrés Celedón Salazar (born 10 September 1979) is a Chilean former footballer.

He played for Cobreloa.

Personal life
In December 2012, he took part in friendly matches to collect money for Sueño Canario (Canary Dream), an initiative to help municipal schools in Quillota. For his team, he played alongside former footballers such as Axel Ahumada, Miguel Ángel Castillo and Franz Arancibia.

Honours

Club
San Marcos de Arica
 Primera B de Chile (1): 2012

References

External links
 BDFA Profile 
 Profile at Goal

1979 births
Living people
Chilean footballers
Footballers from Santiago
Deportes Melipilla footballers
Puerto Montt footballers
Cobreloa footballers
Coquimbo Unido footballers
Unión San Felipe footballers
Ñublense footballers
Santiago Wanderers footballers
San Luis de Quillota footballers
Deportes Iquique footballers
San Marcos de Arica footballers
Chilean Primera División players
Primera B de Chile players
Association football midfielders
Chilean football managers
Coquimbo Unido managers
Chilean Primera División managers